Ma Dunjing may refer to:

Ma Dunjing (1906-1972), Chinese Muslim Lieutenant-General
Ma Dunjing (1910-2003), Chinese Muslim Major-General